The Pakistan national cricket team toured New Zealand in December 1995 and played a Test match against the New Zealand national cricket team, winning by 161 runs. New Zealand were captained by Lee Germon and Pakistan by Wasim Akram. In addition, the teams played a four-match series of Limited Overs Internationals (LOI) which was tied 2–2.

Test series summary

One Day Internationals (ODIs)

The series was tied 2-2.

1st ODI

2nd ODI

3rd ODI

4th ODI

References

External links

1995 in Pakistani cricket
1995 in New Zealand cricket
International cricket competitions from 1994–95 to 1997
New Zealand cricket seasons from 1970–71 to 1999–2000
1995